HMS Renown was a second-class predreadnought battleship built for the Royal Navy in the early 1890s. Intended to command cruiser squadrons operating on foreign stations, the ship served as the flagship of the North America and West Indies Station and the Mediterranean Fleet early in her career. Becoming obsolete as cruiser speeds increased, Renown became a royal yacht and had all of her secondary armament removed to make her more suitable for such duties. She became a stoker's training ship in 1909 and was listed for disposal in 1913. The ship was sold for scrap in early 1914.

Design and description
Production of a new 12-inch gun was behind schedule and the three battleships planned for the 1892 Naval Programme that were intended to use the new gun had to be delayed. In their stead, an improved  design was chosen to keep the workers at Pembroke Dockyard fully employed. No formal requirement for a second-class battleship suitable for use as the flagship on foreign stations or to reinforce cruiser squadrons existed at the time, but the decision to build the ship was strongly influenced by the views of the Controller of the Navy, Rear Admiral John A. "Jacky" Fisher and the Director of Naval Intelligence, Captain Cyprian Bridge who favoured smaller ships with a smaller main armament and large secondary armament. They pressed for additional ships of this type as substitutes for the two other battleships originally programmed, but this was rejected by the Admiralty as there was no demand for additional second-class battleships.

The Director of Naval Construction, William Henry White, submitted three designs in early April 1892 and the smallest one was chosen on 11 April. The design was quite innovative in several different ways. It was the first battleship to use Harvey armour, which allowed the secondary casemates to be armoured, the first to use a sloping armour deck and the first to provide armoured shields over the main armament.

General characteristics

In 1903, the crew numbered between 651 and 674 officers and ratings. She was considered to handle well by her captains and was a good sea-boat. In view of her intended duties abroad, her bottom was coppered to reduce biofouling.

Propulsion
Renown was powered by a pair of three-cylinder vertical triple-expansion steam engines, each driving a single propeller. The engines proved to be more powerful than anticipated and Renown reached  during sea trials under forced draught.

Armament
She was armed with four 32-calibre, breech-loading 10-inch Mk III guns in two twin-gun barbettes, one forward and one aft. Each gun was provided with 105 shells. Her secondary armament consisted of ten 40-calibre quick-firing (QF) 6-inch Mk II guns. Half a dozen of these guns were mounted in casemates on the sides of the hull and the remaining guns were mounted on the upper deck in casemates in the superstructure. Defence against torpedo boats was provided by a dozen QF 12-pounder 12 cwt guns. Eight of these were mounted on the upper deck amidships. Renown also carried eight QF 3-pounder Hotchkiss guns. Each gun was provided with 500 rounds of ammunition. She had five 18-inch torpedo tubes, one in the stern above water and two on each broadside underwater.

Armour
Fore and aft oblique bulkheads,  and ] thick, connected the belt armour to the barbettes. It covered the ship's side between the rear of the barbettes up to the level of the main deck. Oblique bulkheads six inches thick connected the upper armour to the barbettes.

Renown was the first British battleship to be built with a sloped armoured deck behind the main belt as was commonly used on British protected cruisers. The top of the protective deck was even with the top of the main armoured belt and sloped down at 45° angle to meet the bottom of the belt. Outside the barbettes, the lower deck was three inches thick and ran towards the ends of the ship.

The barbettes were protected by  armour plates. The gun turrets that protected the main armament were six inches thick on their face, with three-inch sides and a  roof. They were initially built without a rear plate because of weight distribution problems with the turrets. The upper deck casemates were protected by  plates on the front and sides, but the main deck casemates had six-inch faces and sides. The stern torpedo tube was protected by a mantlet three to six inches thick.

Construction and career

Renown was laid down at Pembroke Dockyard on 1 February 1893 and launched on 8 May 1895. She was completed in January 1897 at a cost of £751,206, but then underwent lengthy sea trials that included the changing of her propeller blades that lasted until June. The ship commissioned on 8 June 1897 and served as flagship for the Commander-in-Chief, Vice Admiral Sir Nowell Salmon, VC, on 26 June, at the Fleet Review at Spithead for the Diamond Jubilee of Queen Victoria, with the Prince of Wales aboard. She was briefly attached to the 1st Division, of the Channel Squadron, from 7 to 12 July for manoeuvres off the south coast of Ireland. On 24 August, Renown became Fisher's flagship, relieving the protected cruiser Crescent as flagship of the North America and West Indies Station. The ship continued as such until beginning a refit in May 1899.

Upon completion of her refit in July, she transferred to the Mediterranean Fleet, once again becoming Fisher's flagship. A strong proponent of the design of Renown, Fisher also found her highly desirable for the hosting of the social events required of a flagship in peacetime. Captain Hugh Tyrwhitt was appointed in command on 19 March 1900. Renown also underwent a special refit at Malta from February to May 1900 to meet Fisher's requirements for her. This included the transfer of the main deck 12-pounders to the superstructure. The ship recommissioned on 19 November 1900, and served as flagship until Fisher ended his tour as Commander-in-Chief on 4 June 1902, after which she continued to serve in the Mediterranean Fleet as a private ship under a new captain, Arthur Murray Farquhar. Renown participated in combined manoeuvres off Cephalonia and Morea between 29 September and 6 October 1902.

After the manoeuvres ended, she was detached from the Mediterranean Fleet and returned to the United Kingdom to be specially fitted out at Portsmouth to carry the Duke and Duchess of Connaught on a royal tour of India. These modifications included removal of the main deck six-inch guns. After the modifications, she was nicknamed the "Battleship Yacht." Renown carried the Duke and Duchess on their royal tour of India from November 1902 to March 1903. The ship rejoined the Mediterranean Fleet in April. In August, she relieved  as flagship of the fleet so that the latter ship could undergo a refit. From 5 to 9 August 1903, Renown participated in manoeuvres off the coast of Portugal.

Renown was placed into reserve at Devon on 15 May 1904, although she participated in manoeuvres the following month. On 21 February 1905, the ship began a special refit at Portsmouth to configure her as a royal yacht. During the refit, the remainder of her secondary armament was removed to increase her accommodations. On 8 October, Renown left Portsmouth bound for Genoa, Italy. At Genoa, the Prince and Princess of Wales—the future King George V and Queen Mary—embarked for a royal tour of India. The first-class protected cruiser  escorted the ship during the tour. At the conclusion of the tour, Renown departed Karachi on 23 March 1906 and arrived at Portsmouth on 7 May. She was placed into reserve on 31 May.

In May 1907, Renown was attached to the Home Fleet as a "subsidiary yacht". Between October and December 1907, Renown carried King Alfonso XIII and Queen Victoria Eugenia of Spain on an official trip to and from the United Kingdom. The ship was transferred to the 4th Division, Home Fleet, at Portsmouth on 1 April 1909. Five months later, 25 September, she began a refit in Portsmouth Dockyard to convert her for use as a stoker's training ship.

During the Coronation Review at Spithead on 24 June 1911 for King George V, the ship was used as an accommodation ship. She was slightly damaged when water tanker Aid rammed her on 26 November 1911. Renown was offered for sale on 31 January 1913 and partially dismantled. In December 1913, she was moored at the Motherbank, awaiting disposal. On 1 April 1914 she was sold at auction to Hughes Bolckow for scrap at a price of £39,000. She was broken up at Blyth.

Notes

Footnotes

References

Further reading

External links

 Renown on The Dreadnought Project

 

Centurion-class battleships
Ships built in Pembroke Dock
1895 ships
Victorian-era battleships of the United Kingdom